Nasa peltata is a species of plant in the Loasaceae family. It is endemic to Ecuador.  Its natural habitats are subtropical or tropical moist montane forests and subtropical or tropical dry shrubland.

References

Endemic flora of Ecuador
peltata
Endangered plants
Taxonomy articles created by Polbot